Pullur is a village in Mukundapuram Taluk in Thrissur district in the state of Kerala, India.

History 
It is one of the  revenue-survey villages formed out of the old Thazhekkad proverti of Mukundapuram Taluk.

Demographics
 India census, Pullur had a population of 12208 with 5829 males and 6379 females.

References

Villages in Mukundapuram Taluk